Joann Fletcher (born 30 August 1966) is an Egyptologist and an honorary visiting professor in the department of archaeology at the University of York. She has published a number of books and academic articles, including several on Cleopatra, and made numerous television and radio appearances. In 2003, she controversially claimed to have identified the mummy of Queen Nefertiti.

Early life and education
Fletcher was born on 30 August 1966 in Barnsley. She was educated at Barnsley College, a sixth-form and further education college in Barnsley. She studied ancient history and Egyptology at University College London, specializing in the Ptolemaic dynasty and Cleopatra, and also in ancient Egyptian hair, wigs, and forms of adornment.

She graduated with a Bachelor of Arts (BA) degree in 1987. Her Doctor of Philosophy (PhD) degree completed in 1996 was undertaken at the University of Manchester, with the thesis on hair and wigs entitled "Ancient Egyptian Hair: a study in style, form, and function".

Career
Fletcher is honorary visiting professor in the Department of Archaeology at the University of York and Head of the Local Ambassador Programme at the Egypt Exploration Society. She is a consultant Egyptologist for Harrogate Museums and Arts and an archaeology consultant for the museums of Wigan and Barnsley, for which she curated a trio of exhibitions in 2017–2018.

In addition, she has contributed to galleries at the National Museum of Ireland, the Great North Museum in Newcastle, Sheffield’s Weston Park Museum, and Scarborough’s Rotunda Museum, as well as having made contributions to the Burrell Collection in Glasgow, a series of mummification exhibitions at Bolton, Burnley, Warrington, and Hull & East Riding museums, and she made contributions to Leiden's Rijksmuseum as part of their 1994 exhibition Clothing of the Pharaohs. In 2012, she and Dr. Stephen Buckley worked with Sheffield's Medico-Legal Centre to mummify a human body donor. They continued this long-term project with the Gordon Museum of Pathology at King's College London, where the body is housed, in line with the wishes of the individual and his family.

In 2003, Fletcher designed the first UK GCSE-equivalent qualification in Egyptology on behalf of the government education body ABC Centra, a programme that ended in 2008. She is co-founder of the York University Mummy Research Group, with whom she has studied human remains from South America, Yemen, Italy, Ireland, the Canary Islands, and Egypt, including the royal tombs in the Valley of the Kings. She has undertaken excavation work in Egypt, Yemen, and the UK, and has examined mummies both on-site and in collections around the world.

Fletcher writes for The Guardian newspaper and the BBC History Magazine and website (including major input into their multimedia project "Death in Sakkara", which won the New Media Award in 2005) and has made numerous appearances on television and radio. She was lead investigator and series consultant in the History Channel television series Mummy Forensics, was at the centre of Mummifying Alan: Egypt's Last Secret, a documentary for Channel 4 and Discovery, the subject of a long-term project she initiated with Dr. Stephen Buckley that rewrote the current understanding of mummification. As part of this documentary she won the 2011 Royal Television Society Award for Science and Natural History, the BAFTA Award for Specialist Factual programme, and an AIB (Association for International Broadcasting) Award for Best Science programme.

In 2015, she was the recipient of the prestigious ‘Surprise Award’ presented at the Proud of Barnsley Awards Ceremony and in 2016, she received the Freedom of the Borough of Barnsley for exceptional service to the Borough award. Her publications include The Story of Egypt, Cleopatra the Great and The Search for Nefertiti, together with guidebooks, journal articles, and academic papers.

Queen Nefertiti

In 2003, Fletcher and a multidisciplinary scientific team from the University of York, including the forensic anthropologist, Don Brothwell, took part in an expedition to the Valley of the Kings in Egypt that was sanctioned by Zahi Hawass, then head of the Supreme Council of Antiquities (SCA). The investigation pursued a hypothesis put forward by Fletcher that one of the three mummies studied could be the mummified body of Queen Nefertiti. All three of the mummified bodies had been found among a cache of mummies in tomb KV35 in 1898. The team's scientific findings supported this and the hypothesis was included in the official report submitted to Hawass and the SCA shortly after the 2003 expedition. The expedition, the result of 12 years of research, was funded by the Discovery Channel, which also produced a documentary on the findings.

Fletcher's conclusions were dismissed by the majority of Egyptologists (some of whom previously claimed that the mummy in question was male who was young as fifteen years old, a theory now disproven), and the evidence used to support Fletcher's theories was declared as insufficient, circumstantial, and inconclusive. Archaeology, a publication of the Archaeological Institute of America, asserted that Fletcher's "identification of the mummy in question as Nefertiti is balderdash". Zahi Hawass, head of the Supreme Council of Antiquities, subsequently banned her from working in Egypt because he said "Dr. Fletcher has broken the rules." Hawass explained this action in an article in the newspaper Al-Ahram:

"There are more than 300 foreign expeditions currently working in Egypt, and they all follow the same guidelines. We grant concessions to any scholar affiliate to a scientific or educational institution, and it has long been accepted code of ethics that any discovery made during excavations should first be reported to the SCA. By going first to the press with what might be considered a great discovery, Fletcher broke the bond made by York University with the Egyptian authorities. And by putting out in the popular media what is considered by most scholars to be an unsound theory, Fletcher has broken the rules and therefore, at least until we have reviewed the situation with her university, she must be banned from working in Egypt."

According to The Times newspaper, British archaeologists "leapt to her defence", however, and they reported that the research team members stood by their findings.
The team members maintained that no rules were broken, on the basis that the official report submitted to the SCA included Fletcher's hypothesis, described by others as a 'discovery', and that Hawass had been informed of what was to be put forward in the television programme prior to the Discovery Channel documentary being aired.

Soon, professional publications revealed that others, including a fierce critic at the time, agreed with Professor Fletcher’s original identification, and eventually, the Hawass ban was lifted. Fletcher resumed working in the Valley of the Kings in April 2008.

Television and radio appearances
1991: Midweek (Egyptian Hair and Cosmetics), BBC Radio 4 (21.2.91)
1998: Post-Mortem: Egypt Uncovered, SC4/Discovery
1999: Mystery of the Mummies: Cave Mummies of the Canary Islands, Union Pictures/Channel 4
1999: Big Breakfast interview, Channel 4 (21.6.99)
1999: Face of the Pharaoh, MBC/National Geographic
1999: Midweek (Mummies), BBC Radio 4 (9.6.99)
2000: Private Lives of the Pharaohs, 3-part series, TV6/Channel 4   	
2000: Face Values: the story of cosmetics, Black Inc./Discovery
2000: The Oldest Mummies in the World: the Chinchorro, Cicada/Discovery
2001: Terry Jones’ Hidden History of Egypt, Seventh Art/BBC
2001: Terry Jones’ Surprising History of Sex and Love, Seventh Art/BBC
2002: Who Murdered Tutankhamen: Revealed, Atlantic/Discovery/Channel 5
2002: The Immortals of Ancient Sheba: the Yemeni Mummies, Juniper/National Geographic/Channel 4
2002: The True Curse of the Mummy, Stone City Films/Channel 5  	
2002: Pyramid (interactive), BBC Digital Channel
2003: The Black Mummy of Libya, Fulcrum/Channel 5
2003: Nefertiti Revealed, Atlantic/Discovery/Channel 5
2003: Carvilius: the Mummy of Rome, GA&A/National Geographic
2003: Ancient Egyptians, WalltoWall/Channel 4
2003: The Making of Ancient Egyptians, WalltoWall/Channel 4
2003: Everywoman, World Service Radio (14.6.03)
2005: Death In Sakkara, BBC Interactive
2005: The Myth, the Magic, and the Mummy’s Curse, BBC Interactive Museum exhibition
2005: New research on the life and death of Irt-yruw, Tyne-Tees news (16.11.05)
2006: Timewatch: Bog Bodies, BBC
2006: The Mummies of Hull Museum, BBC Look North (3.3.06)
2006: The Bog Bodies of Ireland, 60 Minutes News, Australia (22.3.06)
2007: My Yorkshire, ITV Yorkshire 
2008: Mummy Forensics, 6-part series (Lead Investigator and Series Consultant), History Channel
2008: Cleopatra the Great, BBC Radio York morning show (14.5.08)
2010: ‘A History of the World in a Hundred Objects’: the Anubis Mask, the Inlaid Eye, BBC Radio York (18.1.10 7am, 24.1.10 11am, 16.2.10 10.45pm and 8.4.10 11am) (26.5.10)
2011: Mummifying Alan: Egypt’s Last Secret, Blink/Channel 4/Discovery
2012: ‘Death Cult: Bog Bodies of Ireland’ (Ancient X Files) series WAG TV for National Geographic Channel
2013: Ancient Egypt: Life and Death in the Valley of the Kings (2-part series; Writer/Presenter), BBC/Lion TV.
2013: Life and Death in the Valley of the Kings (Writer/Presenter), BBC Learning Zone/Lion TV
2013: Radio 5 Live with Richard Bacon (2.15-3pm), BBC Radio 5 (26.2.13)
2013: Woman’s Hour, BBC Radio 4 (22.3.13)
2013: Barnsley Museum Opening, Look North and BBC Radio Sheffield 27.6.13
2013: "Museum of Curiosity", Episode 1 of series 6, BBC Radio 4 (30.9.13)
2014: Egypt's Lost Queens (Writer/Presenter), BBC/Lion TV
2014: Woman’s Hour, BBC Radio 4 (3.9.14)
2015: "Seventy Million Animal Mummies: Egypt’s Dark Secret", Horizon, BBC2
2015: The Amazing History of Egypt, BBC History Magazine podcast
2015: The Radio 2 Arts Show with Claudia Winkleman, BBC Radio 2 (2.10.15)
2015: Midweek, BBC Radio 4 (21.10.15)
2015: Radio 4 in Four: Most Po Radio 4pular, BBC Radio 4
2015: Symbols and Secrets, The Forum, BBC World Service (12.12.15)
2016: Immortal Egypt with Joann Fletcher (4-part series; Writer/Presenter), BBC/Lion TV
2016: A Good Read, BBC Radio 4 (12.7.16)
2016: Tattoos in Africa, Al-Jazeera Online
2017: Women in History Debate, BBC History Magazine podcast
2017: The Egypt Centre Museum of Egyptian Antiquities, promotional video
2017: Professors at Play: Assassins Creed Origins, internet broadcast (14.11), KM
2018: ‘BBC Civilisations Festival in South Yorkshire’, BBC Radio Sheffield (7.3.18)
2018: BBC Civilisations festival (with Margaret Mountford), The Star
2018: ‘Bolton’s Egypt: new museum galleries’, BBC 1 North-West Tonight (21.9.18)
2019: Egypt's Unexplained Files (10 part series), Discovery Science (360 Productions/Discovery)
2020: PM Show, BBC Radio 4 (24.1.20)

Fletcher is notable for her strong Yorkshire accent. In a 2004 interview she said,: "I've even been criticised because I'm a female in my thirties and have a Barnsley accent, but
then if you don't conform to the stereotype of a tweed-clad Egyptologist with the appearance of someone aged around 83, your work becomes the target for attack.https://www.heraldscotland.com/news/12419618.debate-of-the-age-resurrected-egyptologist-joann-fletcher-looks-to-have-unearthed-an-archaeological-triumph-with-the-discovery-of-the-body-of-a-controversial-queen-by-anne-simpson/

Selected works

 
 
 
 

Notes and references

References

External links
 (University of York staff page)
"No Discrimination" – Article by Zahi Hawass on Fletcher's Nefertiti claims and the media's reaction.
"King Tut tut tut" (Sunday Times'' article)

Joann Fletcher profile, BBC, 24 September 2014.

1966 births
Academics of the University of York
Alumni of the University of Manchester
Alumni of University College London
British archaeologists
British Egyptologists
British women archaeologists
Living people
People from Barnsley
People from Scarborough, North Yorkshire